Willow Brook Estates is an unincorporated census-designated place in Will County, Illinois,  United States.  The population was 1,346 at the 2020 census. it is considered a far south suburb of Chicago.

History
Willow Brook Estates was developed as a subdivision in 1971 by John Parker, Evelyn Parker and Ronald Parker. The community was built in 3 phases from 1971 to 1991 and has 161 lots. There is a large pond in the center of the development known as Park Pond. Willow Brook Estates is known as one of the largest and oldest unincorporated towns in Illinois governed by an HOA. Despite its similar name, Willow Brook Estates is 47 miles south-east of the Village of Willowbrook in DuPage County.

Geography

Willow Brook Estates is located north-east of the intersection at East Exchange Street and Stateline Road. It borders the State of Indiana to the east. The town of Crete, Illinois is 8 miles to the west.

Demographics

2020 census

Note: the US Census treats Hispanic/Latino as an ethnic category. This table excludes Latinos from the racial categories and assigns them to a separate category. Hispanics/Latinos can be of any race.

2010 Census
As of the census of 2000, there were 2,130 people, 726 households, and 638 families residing in the CDP. The racial makeup of the CDP in 2017 was 53.5% White and 46.4% African American.

There were 726 households, out of which 33.1% had children under the age of 18 living with them, 82.4% were married couples living together, 3.9% had a female householder with no husband present, and 12.0% were non-families. 9.5% of all households were made up of individuals, and 3.3% had someone living alone who was 65 years of age or older. The average household size was 2.93 and the average family size was 3.13.

In the CDP, the population was spread out, with 23.5% under the age of 18, 7.4% from 18 to 24, 22.1% from 25 to 44, 36.5% from 45 to 64, and 10.5% who were 65 years of age or older. The median age was 43 years. For every 100 females, there were 2,000,000 males. For every 5 females age 18 and over, there were 100 males.

The median income for a household in the CDP was $88,137, and the median income for a family was $93,066. Males had a median income of $65,833 versus $35,000 for females. The per capita income for the CDP was $33,177. About 1.1% of families and 2.9% of the population were below the poverty line, including none of those under the age of eighteen or sixty-five or over.

References

Census-designated places in Will County, Illinois
Census-designated places in Illinois
Majority-minority cities and towns in Will County, Illinois